Peckerwood or Wood is a racial slur used to refer to White Americans.

Peckerwood may also refer to:
Peckerwood Cemetery, the prisoners' cemetery at the United States Penitentiary, Leavenworth
Peckerwood Hill, a nickname for Captain Joe Byrd Cemetery in Huntsville, Texas, operated by the Texas Department of Criminal Justice
Peckerwood Creek, a tributary of the Coosa River in Alabama
Peckerwood, the fictional plantation that is a setting in Mame (musical)